The O'Kanes is the self-titled debut album by American country music duo The O'Kanes. It was released in 1986 via Columbia Records. The album includes the singles "Oh Darlin' (Why Don't You Care for Me No More)", "Can't Stop My Heart from Loving You". "Daddies Need to Grow Up Too" and "Just Lovin' You".

Track listing

Chart performance

References

1986 debut albums
The O'Kanes albums
Columbia Records albums